Los Angeles International Culture Film Festival (LAICFF) is an international film festival. It celebrates cultural diversity through the media of film. With its global competition program and highlight screenings, LAICFF aims not only to support under-discovered filmmakers with exhibition platform and development opportunities, but more importantly, to raise awareness and improve understanding of diverse international cultures in America, and to enhance the influence of these global cultures via the power of cinema.

History
LAICFF was founded in 2015 by International Scholars Film Association, a student-run non-profit film organization based on University of California, Los Angeles, and is intended to run annually every year.

Awards and prizes
Awards are given out in the following categories:
 Jury's Culture Award - given to the submission which best demonstrates or presents a certain regional culture, and therefore has the highest cultural significance.
 Best Picture
 Best Director
 Best Screenplay
 Best Documentary
 Best Cinematography
 Best Production Design

References

External links
 Official website

Film festivals in Los Angeles